Yangzhou, postal romanization Yangchow, is a prefecture-level city in central Jiangsu Province (Suzhong), East China. Sitting on the north bank of the Yangtze, it borders the provincial capital Nanjing to the southwest, Huai'an to the north, Yancheng to the northeast, Taizhou to the east, and Zhenjiang across the river to the south. Its population was 4,414,681 at the 2010 census and its urban area is home to 2,146,980 inhabitants, including three urban districts, currently in the agglomeration.

Historically, Yangzhou was one of the wealthiest cities in China, known at various periods for its great merchant families, poets, artists, and scholars. Its name (lit. "Rising Prefecture") refers to its former position as the capital of the ancient Yangzhou prefecture in imperial China. Yangzhou was one of the first cities to benefit from one of the earliest World Bank loans in China, used to construct Yangzhou thermal power station in 1994.

Administration

Currently, the prefecture-level city of Yangzhou administers six county-level divisions, including three districts, two county-level cities and one county. Accordingly, they are further divided into 98 township-level divisions, including 87 towns and townships, and 11 subdistricts.

History

Ancient China
During the Spring and Autumn Period of the Zhou dynasty, the hegemon Fuchai of Wu constructed the Han or Hangou Canal   Hángōu) to improve his supply lines from his center of power around present-day Suzhou to the North China Plain, where he was engaged in an ongoing conflict with Qi. Taking advantage of the many streams and lakes of the Jianghuai Plain, the canal connected the Yangtze River within present-day Yangzhou to the Huai River within present-day Huai'an by 486BC. The next year, Fuchai established a fortress to protect the southern end of the new canal at Hancheng. The town was intended to stall any possible counterattack from Qi down the canal, giving time to raise reinforcements from Suzhou and Wu's other lands in the Yangtze Delta.

Imperial China
Under the Han, the area was organized as the Guangling Commandery of Xu Province. Its seat of governmentalso known as Guanglingwas also near the confluence of the Yangtze and the Han Canal, although at a slightly different location than the former Wu fortress. 

Under the Sui, Guangling was reorganized as Yang Province (zhou) in the year 590. Its seat of government took the new name as well. Prospering as the Emperor Yang (r.604–617) connected the Han Canal to other waterways north and south to form the core of the Grand Canal, Yangzhou became the southern capital of China under the name Jiangdu. With the failure of his invasions of Korea and a series of natural disasters, Emperor Yang abandoned to north entirely in 616 and made Jiangdu his primary capital until his assassination in 618.

Restoring the name Guangling, the Tang made the city a major port for foreign trade and turned it into a leading economic and cultural center. Many foreign merchants lived in the city, including many Koreans, Arabs, and Persians. Thousands of the Muslim merchants were massacred in 760 by forces under Tian Shengong, sent to suppress the city's rebellion.

Guangling served briefly as the capital of a revived Wu Kingdom during the Five Dynasties and Ten Kingdoms period.

After the 1127 Jingkang Incident led to the Jurchen Jin conquest of Kaifeng, the Song used Yangzhou as their capital in 1128 and 1129. Song troops under Du Chong  Dù Chōng, d.1141) breached the southern embankments of the Yellow River in an effort to stop the Jin army, but the resulting avulsion caused the river to swing south of the Shandong Peninsula and capture the Si River and lower Huai. The Grand Canal was truncated for decades and the Southern Song moved to Lin'an (present-day Hangzhou).

In 1280, during the Yuan, Yangzhou was the site of a massive gunpowder explosion when the bomb store of the Weiyang arsenal accidentally caught fire. The blast killed over a hundred guards, hurled debris from buildings into the air that landed 10 li away, and could be felt 100 li. Marco Polo claimed to have served Kubilai Khan in Yangzhou shortly thereafter, variously placed at 1282–1285 or 1282–1287. Although some versions of Polo's memoirs imply that he was the governor of Yangzhou, it is more likely that he was an official in the salt industry if he was employed there at all. Surviving Chinese texts do not mention him at all. It is well documented, however, that Kublai Khan trusted foreigners more than Chinese subjects in internal affairs and the discovery of the 1342 tomb of Katarina Vilioni, member of an Italian trading family in Yangzhou, does, however, suggest the existence of an Italian community in the city in the 14th century. Moreover, both in The Travels of Marco Polo and in the History of Yuan there is documentation about a Nestorian Christian who funded two churches in China during the three years he served as an official of the emperor. This functionary is named "Mar Sarchis" by Marco Polo and "Ma Xuelijisi" in the History of Yuan. This person served as a supervisor in the province of Zhenjiang. Arabic inscriptions during the 13th and 14th centuries similarly indicate a revival of the Muslim community.

During the Ming dynasty (1368–1644) until the 19th century Yangzhou acted as a major trade exchange center for salt (a government regulated commodity), rice, and silk.

After the fall of Beijing and northern China to the Manchus in 1644, Yangzhou remained under the control of the short-lived Southern Ming based in Nanjing. Qing forces led by Prince Dodo reached Yangzhou in the spring of 1645, and despite the heroic efforts of its chief defender, Shi Kefa, the city fell on May 20, 1645, after a brief siege. The Yangzhou massacre followed; Wang Xiuchu's contemporary account alleged that the number of victims was close to 800,000, but that number is certainly an exaggeration. Shi Kefa himself was killed by the Manchus when he refused to switch his allegiance to the Qing regime.

The city's rapid recovery from these events and its great prosperity through the early and middle years of the Qing dynasty were due to its role as administrative center of the Lianghuai sector of the government salt monopoly. As early as 1655, the Dutch envoy Johan Nieuhof described the city of Yangzhoufu ( in his transcription):

Famed at that time and since for literature, art, and the gardens of its merchant families, many of which were visited by the Kangxi and Qianlong emperors during their Southern Tours, the Qing-era Yangzhou has been the focus of intensive research by historians.

The Yangzhou riot in 1868 was a pivotal moment of Anglo-Chinese relations during late Qing China that almost led to war. The crisis was fomented by the scholar-officials of the city, who opposed the presence of foreign Christian missionaries there. The riot that resulted was an angry crowd estimated at eight to ten thousand who assaulted the premises of the British China Inland Mission in Yangzhou by looting, burning and attacking the missionaries led by Hudson Taylor. No one was killed, however several of the missionaries were injured as they were forced to flee for their lives. As a result of the report of the riot, the British consul in Shanghai, Sir Walter Henry Medhurst took seventy Royal Marines in a man-of-war and steamed up the Yangtze to Nanjing in a controversial show of force that eventually resulted in an official apology from Viceroy Zeng Guofan and financial restitution made to the injured missionaries.

Modern China
From the time of the Taiping Rebellion (1853) to the beginning of the Reform Era (1980) Yangzhou was in decline, due to war damage, neglect of the Grand Canal as railways replaced it in importance, and stagnation in the early decades of the PRC. During the Second Sino-Japanese War, it endured eight years of Japanese occupation and was used by the enemy as a site for internment camps. About 1200 civilians of Allied nationalities (mostly British and Australian) from Shanghai were transported here in 1943, and located in one of three camps (A, B, and C). Camps B and C were closed down in September, 1943, after the second American-Japanese prisoner exchange, and their inhabitants transferred back to Shanghai camps.  Camp C, located in the former American Mission in the north-west of the city, was maintained for the duration of the war.

Among early plans for railways in the late Qing was one for a line that would connect Yangzhou to the north but this was jettisoned in favour of an alternative route. The city's status as a leading economic centre in China was never to be restored. Not until the 1990s did it begin to regain some semblance of prosperity, benefitting from national economic growth and a number of targeted development projects. With the canal now partially restored, and excellent rail and road connections, Yangzhou is once again an important transportation and market center. It also has some industrial output, chiefly in cotton and textiles. In 2004, a railway linked Yangzhou for the first time with Nanjing.

Geography

Yangzhou is located on a plain north of the Yangtze. The Grand Canal, also known as the Jing-Hang Canal, crosses the prefecture-level from the north to the south; its modern route passes through the eastern outskirts of Yangzhou's main urban area, while its old route runs through the city center. Other major bodies of water within the prefecture-level city include the Baoshe River, Datong River, Beichengzi River, Tongyang Canal, Xintongyang Canal, Baima Lake, Baoying Lake, Gaoyou Lake and Shaobo Lake.

Like much of the entire prefecture-level city, Yangzhou's main urban area (the "city proper") is criss-crossed by an intricate network of canals and small lakes. The historic city center (the former waled city) is surrounded by canals on all sides: the Old Grand Canal forms its eastern and southern boundaries; the City Moat Canal runs along the former walled city's northern edge, connecting the Old Grand Canal with the Slender West Lake; the Erdaohe Canal runs along the old city's western edge, from the Slender West Lake to the Lotus Flower Pond (Hehuachi), which in its turn is connected by the short Erdaogou canal with the Old Grand Canal. It is possible to sail a small water craft from the Thin West Lake, via the Erdaohe, the Hehua Pond, and the Erdaogou into the Old Grand Canal.

Climate
Yangzhou has a subtropical monsoon climate with humid changeable wind; longer winters for about 4 months, summers 3 months and shorter springs and autumns, 2 months respectively; frost-free period of 222 days and annual average sunshine of 2177 hours.

The rainy season known as "plum rain season" usually lasts from mid-June to late July. During this season, the plums are ripening, hence the name plum rain.

Transportation

Yangzhou has one Yangtze River crossing, the Runyang Yangtze River Bridge complex, which has one of the longest suspension bridge spans in the world, and carries the G4011 Yangzhou–Liyang Expressway to Zhenjiang.

Air
The Yangzhou Taizhou International Airport, completed in 2012 to serve Yangzhou and neighbouring Taizhou, is located in Jiangdu district. Prior to the completion of the Yangzhou Taizhou Airport, Lukou Airport in Nanjing was the primary air gateway for passengers destined for Yangzhou. There are over 10 airline ticket offices in Yangzhou, providing convenient service for foreign and domestic tourists. domestic and international fight are available with 10 international airlines and more than 20 domestic ones

Rail
Until 2004, Yangzhou was not served by passenger rail. Yangzhou railway station began construction in 2003 and was completed a year later. It is located on the western outskirts of the city, and is a major station on the Nanjing–Qidong railway, and provides direct passenger service to the provincial capital as well as a number of major cities to the west, north, and south (such as Xi'an, Wuhan, and Guangzhou), including an overnight Z-series express train to Beijing. Later, frequent high-speed (D-series) service has been introduced on this line as well.

There is no direct rail service between Yangzhou and Shanghai, however; to travel to Shanghai, or elsewhere in the Yangtze Delta regions, travelers cross the Yangtze over the new Runyang Bridge to Zhenjiang (frequent commuter bus service is available) and take a train from the Zhenjiang Railway Station, which is located on the main Nanjing-Shanghai rail line.

In 2016, construction work started on a new north–south rail line, the Lianyungan-Huai'an-Yangzhou-Zhenjiang Railway. The new rail line is expected to open in 2020, while the new train station will gradually become the city's transportation hub, and its surrounding area, Yangzhou's new central business district.

River transport 
The average water depth is 15–20 meters. In 1992, the State Council approved it to become a first-grade open state harbour, and General Secretary Jiang Zemin inscribed its name. Now, it has developed into a comprehensive inland harbor, integrating passenger, freight, container transportation and harbour trade, and has become the main distribution center of northern Jiangsu province, eastern Anhui Province and southeast Shandong Province. There are several dozen categories of goods including iron and steel, timber, minerals, coal, grain, cotton, container, products of light industry and machinery. The passenger routes reach Nanjing, Wuhu, Jiujiang, Huangshi and Wuhan in the west, and Nantong and Shanghai in the east. Some well-known luxury international liners also anchor here. The harbour has greatly promoted the development of exports and the overall local economy.

Expressways

The Ningyang (Nanjing–Yangzhou) Expressway crosses the southern part of Yangzhou's metropolitan area while the Ningtong (Nanjing–Nantong) Expressway is connected to Yangzhou at Liaojiagou. In recent years, local government have attached great importance to the development of the tourism, in conjunction with a greater effort dedicated to the improvement of the local road transport system. With a total investment of 680 million yuan, the Yangzhou section of the Ningyang Expressway was completed on December 18, 1998, and opened to traffic in June 1999. It then passes the Jiangdu Flyover to directly link up with the Huaijiang Expressway. In addition, the section of Huaijiang Expressway within the territory of Yangzhou began construction on March 22, 1997, which will be commonly used by the state planned Tongjiang–Sanya and Beijing–Shanghai trunk lines. The section of Huaijiang Expressway in Yangzhou totals in length, starting from Jinghe Town of Baoying in the north to the entry/exist of Zhuanqiaozhen Flyover of Jiangdu in the south. It then links with Ningtong Expressway, passing by three counties (cities) such as Baoying, Gaoyou and Jiangdu and 26 towns, at a total cost of 3.7 billion yuan. It is expected to be open to traffic by the year 2000.

Intercity bus service
During the daytime, frequent bus service operates between Yangzhou and nearby cities. There are several bus stations on the city's outskirts; most of the buses from Nanjing (Nanjing West Bus Station) and Zhenjiang (where the bus station is adjacent to the Zhenjiang Railway Station) arrive to Yangzhou South Bus Station, located a few kilometers southwest from downtown. Most of the intercity bus service stops in the early evening.

Transportation in the Urban Area
The city is served by an extensive network of public bus routes.

Yangzhou's taxi industry began in 1982, and has developed rapidly since 1993. the city has over 40 taxi companies of various ownership structures, with a total of 1,571 vehicles. Parking lots were established at key stations and hotels, and eight taxi companies have opened round-the-clock telephone service. The construction department of the municipal government has strengthened the management of taxi services, providing education in the relevant laws, professional ethics and safety aspects.

In 2014, Yangzhou's government approved plans for the construction of a subway system, which will initially include two lines. Line 1 will run in the general east–west direction, from Yangzhou Railway Station in the west to the historic central city to the future high-speed railway station (east of the Grand Canal) to Jiangdu District. Line 2 will run in the general north–south direction.

Tourist Transportation

To develop tourism in Yangzhou, sightseeing buses have been introduced in the city run by the Tianma travel agency under the Yangzhou Tourist Bureau. There is a tour guide on each bus. The route, starting from Yangzhou station, has eight stops, and passes by such scenic spots of the Slender West Lake, Daming Temple, Imperial Dock, Siwang Pagoda, Wenchang Pagoda and Shita Temple. Yangzhou Public Transit also operates No.1, No.5 and No.2 special tourist lines. No.1 bus departs from the bus station and goes by the Slender West Lake, Shigong Temple, Geyuan Garden and Heyuan Garden; No.5 bus starts from the bus station and goes by the Crane Temple, Wenchang Pagoda, Slender West Lake, Five-Pavilion Bridge, and Pingshan Hall. A sight-seeing route on Slender West Lake has opened, connecting Imperial Dock, Yichun Garden, Hong Garden, Dahong Bridge, Xiaojinshan, Diaoyutai, Five-Pavilion Bridge, and the 24-bridge, finally reaching Daming Temple and Pingshan Hall.

Industries and Shipyards
Yangzhou is the site of Chengxi shipyard, large shipyard where bulk carriers and other types of large ships are built. Owned partly by the state owned CSSC holdings, through Jiangsu Xinrong shipyard, Chengxi Yangzhou shipyard builds ships from 25,000 dwt to 170,000 dwt in size.

Cuisine

Yangzhou dishes may be one of the reasons why the people of Yangzhou are so infatuated with their city. They have an appealing color, aroma, taste and appearance. The original color of each ingredient is preserved after cooking, and no oily sauce is added, so as to retain the fresh flavour of the food.

In Yangzhou all dishes, whether cheap or expensive, are elaborate. Cooks will not scrimp on their work, even with dazhu gansi, a popular dish that costs only a few yuan. Dry bean curd is made by each restaurant that serves it, so the flavor is guaranteed. The cook slices the 1-cm-thick curd into 30 shreds, each one paper-thin but none broken, and then stews them for hours with chopped bamboo shoots and shelled shrimps in chicken soup. In this way the dry bean curd shreds can soak up the flavor of the other ingredients, and the soup is clear but savory. Not only Yangzhou cooks, but also the ordinary people are conscientious about cooking.

 Fu Chun Teahouse
 Yangzhou fried rice, is said  to have been invented by a person who was a former Yangzhou magistrate.

Culture

The Yangzhou dialect of Chinese is representative of Lower Yangtze Mandarin, and is particularly close to the official language of the Ming and Qing courts, which was based on the Nanjing dialect. However, it does differ considerably from modern Standard Chinese, although they are still moderately mutually intelligible.

Dialect has also been used as a tool for regional identity and politics in the Jiangbei and Jiangnan regions. While the city of Yangzhou was the center of trade, flourishing and prosperous, it was considered part of Jiangnan, which was known to be wealthy, even though Yangzhou was north of the Yangzi river. Once Yangzhou's wealth and prosperity were gone, it was then considered to be part of Jiangbei, the "backwater". After Yangzhou was removed from Jiangnan, its residents decided to replace Jianghuai Mandarin, which was the dialect of Yangzhou, with Taihu Wu dialects. In Jiangnan itself, multiple subdialects of Wu fought for the position of prestige dialect.

During a period of prosperity and imperial favour, the arts of storytelling and painting flourished in Yangzhou. The innovative painter-calligrapher Shitao lived in Yangzhou during the 1680s and again from 1697 until his death in 1707. A later group of painters from that time called the Eight Eccentrics of Yangzhou are famous throughout China.

Former General secretary of CPC, President of China Jiang Zemin was born and raised in Yangzhou. His middle school is located right across from the public notary's office in Yangzhou.

Yangzhou is famous for its carved lacquerware and jade.

Some of China's most creative and eye catching dishes come from the Yangzhou school of cuisine called Huaiyang (also commonly known as the Weiyang school). Along with Sichuan cuisine, Cantonese cuisine, and Shandong cuisine, Huaiyang cuisine is a distinctive and masterful skill that locals are quite proud of.

The city is famous for its public bath houses, lacquerware, jadeware, embroidery, paper-cut, art & crafts velvet flavers.

The city was awarded Habitat Scroll of Honour in 2006.

Yangzhou is also very famous for its toy industry (especially stuffed animals). Many tourists from neighboring cities travel to the city for its good-quality and low-priced toys.

It is worth mentioning that the city is also famous for an ancient folk art called Yangzhou storytelling, which is like Xiangsheng—the traditional Chinese comedic performance. It rose as a performing act during the Ming dynasty. In the performance, the artist details an interesting historical story to audiences, using Yangzhou dialect. These stories have been edited by artists, so they sound very soul-stirring and funny. The best known artist of Yangzhou storytelling was Wang shaotang. His most famous works are The 10 chapters of Wu Song, The 10 chapters of Song Jiang, The 10 chapters of Lu Junyi, and The 10 chapters of Shi Xiu.

Literary references
Yangzhou was frequently referenced in Chinese literature.  Poet Li Bai (c.700–762) wrote in Seeing Meng Haoran off to Yangzhou from Yellow Crane Pavilion:

At Yellow Crane Pavilion in the west
My old friend says farewell;
In the mist and flowers of spring
He goes down to Yangzhou;
Lonely sail, distant shadow,
Vanish in blue emptiness;
All I see is the great river
Flowing into the far horizon.

Du Mu wrote the famous lines on Yangzhou:

After ten years, I awoke from my Yangzhou dream,
All I gained was a fickle reputation in the green mansions.

The "green mansions" or "green/black lofts" (qinglou) refers to the pleasure districts for which Yangzhou became known.

In the Qing dynasty novel Dream of the Red Chamber, the character of Lin Daiyu is from Yangzhou.

Tourism

Tourist sights include Slender West Lake and old residences in the moated town, such as the Wang Residence and the Daming temple. Yangzhou is famous for its many well preserved Yangzhou style gardens.  Most of the Historic city is in the Guangling District.

Slender West Lake

Named after Hangzhou's famous West Lake, this long, narrow stretch of water which meanders through Yangzhou's western limits is a well-known scenic spot. A long bank planted with weeping willows spans the lake; at its midpoint stands a square terrace with pavilions at each of the corners and one in the center. Around the lake is a park in which are found several attractions: Lotus Flower Pagoda (Lianhua SO), a white structure reminiscent of the White Pagoda (Baita) in Beijing's Beihai Park; Small Gold Mountain (Xiao Jin Shan); and the Fishing Platform (Diaoyutai), a favorite retreat of the Qing emperor Qian Long. The emperor was so gratified by his luck in fishing at this spot that he ordered additional stipends for the town. As it turns out, his success had been augmented by local swimmers who lurked in the lake busily attaching fish to his hook.

Daming Temple

Located on Shugang Hill, in the city's northwest, is Fajing Temple, formerly known as DaMing Temple. The original temple was built in Liu Song dynasty (420–479). A nine-story pagoda, the Qilingta, was built on the temple grounds in the year of Sui dynasty (589–618) . A recent addition to the temple complex is the Jianzhen Memorial Hall, built according to Tang dynasty methods and financed with contributions raised by Buddhist groups in Japan.
When Qing Emperor Qian Long visited Yangzhou in 1765, he was troubled by The temple's name DaMing (which literally means "Great Ming') fearing that it might revive nostalgia for the Ming dynasty, which was overthrown by his Manchu predecessors. He had it renamed Fajing Temple.
The temple was seriously damaged during the Taiping Rebellion at the beginning of the 20th century. The present structure is a reconstruction dating from the 1930s.

Flat Hills (Ping Shan) Hall
Built by the Song dynasty writer Ouyang Xiu when he served as prefect of the city, this hall stands just west of Fajing Temple. Looking out from this hall, the mountains to the south of the Yangtze River appear as a line at the viewer's eye level, hence the name Flat Hills Hall. When Ouyang Xiu's student Su Dongpo moved to Yangzhou, he too served as prefect of the city. He had a hall built directly behind the one erected by his master, and called it Guling Hall.

Pavilion of Flourishing Culture (Wénchāng Gé)

This round, three-story pavilion in Yangzhou's eastern sector was built in 1585 and celebrates the city's rich cultural traditions. It is also the de facto center of the city.

Built during Ming dynasty, it is located on the cross of Wenchang Road and Wenhe Road. The whole building is about 79-foot high, and looks like Temple of Heaven in Beijing. Today, bordered by many shopping stores, Wenchange had been a symbol of commercial center to residents.

Stone Pagoda 
Standing west of the Pavilion of Flourishing Culture is a five-story Tang dynasty pagoda. Built in 837, it is the oldest pagoda still standing in Yangzhou.

Tomb of Puhaddin

This is essentially a Ming dynasty graveyard that includes the tomb of Puhaddin. According to information at the tomb, he was a 16th generation descendant of Muhammad, The Prophet. The tomb is on the eastern bank of the (Old) Grand Canal in the eastern sector of the city and is adjacent to a mosque which houses a collection of valuable materials documenting China's relations with Muslim countries.

Ge Garden (Gè Yuán)
The entrance to this typical southern style garden with its luxuriant bamboo groves, ponds, and rock grottoes is on Dongguan St. in the city's northeast section. Designed by the great Qing dynasty landscape painter Shi Tao for Wang Yingtai, an officer of the Qing imperial court, this garden takes its name from the shape of bamboo leaves which resemble the Chinese character ge, meaning "a" or "an."

He Garden (Hé Yuán)

Yechun Garden (Yechun Yuan)
In this garden, which lies on the banks of the Xiading River at the city's northern limits, the Qing dynasty poet Wang Yuyang and a circle of friends used to gather to recite their works. The thatched roofs of the pavilions in this garden give it a quaint, rustic air.

Yangzhou Museum & Yangzhou Block Printing Museum 

Situated on the west side of the Bright Moon Lake, the Yangzhou Chinese Block Printing Museum and Yangzhou Museum look into the distance of Yangzhou International Exhibition Centre and covers an area of 50,000 square meters, with a construction space of 25,000 square meters, and an exhibition area of 10,000 square metres. Its unique architectural form embodies the harmony of man nature, structure and natural environment. In August, 2003, over 300,000 ancient books blockings were collected from Guangling Press of Yangzhou and China Block Printing Museum was established under the approval of the State Council, over 300,000 ancient book blockings collected by Guangling Press of Yangzhou were included in the new museum.

Jiangdu Hydro Project
Construction of this multiple-purpose water control project, the biggest in China, started in 1961 and was completed in 1975. The project includes facilities for irrigation, drainage, navigation, and power generation. It consists of four large modern electric pumping stations, six medium-sized check gates, thrice navigation locks, and two trunk waterways.

Education

Universities and colleges 
Yangzhou University
Yangzhou Polytechnic College
Yangzhou Polytechnic Institute

Primary and secondary education 

 Yangzhou High School of Jiangsu Province
 HanJiang High School Of Jiangsu Province
Yangzhou Xinhua High School
Shuren School of Yangzhou Middle School Education Group
High School Affiliated to Yangzhou University
Yangzhou NO.1 Middle School
Guazhou High School
Jiangdu High School of Jiangsu Province
Baoying High School of Jiangsu Province
Gaoyou High School of Jiangsu Province
Yizheng High School of Jiangsu Province

Sister cities

  Balashikha, Moscow Oblast, Russia
  Kent, Washington, US
  Malacca City, Malaysia
  Neubrandenburg, Germany
  Offenbach am Main, Germany (since 1997)
  Orléans, France
  Porirua, New Zealand
  Vaughan, Ontario, Canada
  Westport, Connecticut, US
  Colchester, UK

See also
Iranians in China

References

Sources
 
 online ACLS Humanities E-Book
 

 "Yangzhou." Encyclopedia of China. ed. Dorothy Perkins. Chicago: Roundtable Press. 1999.

External links

Government website of Yangzhou 

 
Populated places established in the 1st millennium BC
Cities in Jiangsu
National Forest Cities in China